Sir Francis Popham KB (1646–1674), of Littlecote House, Wiltshire and Houndstreet, Somerset, was an English politician.

He was the eldest surviving son of Alexander Popham of Littlecote.

He was a Member (MP) of the Parliament of England for Bath from 1669 to 1674. He succeeded his father in 1669 and was made a Knight of the Bath the same year.

He married Helena, the daughter and heiress of Hugh Rogers of Cannington, Somerset and had a son, Alexander and a daughter.

References

1646 births
1674 deaths
People from Wiltshire
Politicians from Somerset
Knights of the Bath
English MPs 1661–1679